Canyon Springs High School is a high school in Caldwell, Idaho. It is operated by the 
Caldwell School District.

References

External links

High schools in Idaho
Schools in Canyon County, Idaho